Elektron may refer to:
 Elektron (alloy), a magnesium alloy
 Elektron (company), a musical instrument company
 Elektron (ISS), a Russian oxygen generator
 Elektron (resin) or amber, a fossilised resin
 Elektron (satellite), a series of four Soviet particle physics satellites

See also
 Electron, a subatomic particle
 Electron (disambiguation)
 Tron (disambiguation)